Park Hyun (born 24 September 1988) is a South Korean footballer who played as a midfielder for Gwangju FC in the K League Challenge.

External links 
 

1988 births
Living people
Association football midfielders
South Korean footballers
Gwangju FC players
K League 1 players
K League 2 players